"What I Want" is a song written and recorded by English pop band Dead or Alive. It was co-produced by the band and Zeus B. Held and released in August 1983 as the second single from Dead or Alive's debut studio album Sophisticated Boom Boom (1984).

Background
The song was not a success when released, peaking at No. 88 in the UK Singles Chart. After Dead or Alive's UK Top 40 success of "That's the Way (I Like It)", "What I Want" was re-issued in June 1984. It did not fare much better during its second chart run, placing only one position higher, at No. 87.

Track listing

Chart performance
The single was re-released in June 1984, however, it proved to be a slight, but bigger hit than the original. Both versions charted in the UK, separated by only one position between the two.

External links

1983 singles
Dead or Alive (band) songs
Songs written by Pete Burns
1983 songs
Songs written by Mike Percy (musician)
Epic Records singles
Songs written by Wayne Hussey